The  are a mountain range on the Tsugaru Peninsula of Aomori Prefecture, in Honshū, Japan.

Some mountains in the range are Mount Bonju, Mount Maruyakata, Tongari-dake, and Mount Manogami.

References

Mountain ranges of Aomori Prefecture
Aomori (city)
Goshogawara
Nakadomari, Aomori
Sotogahama, Aomori
Imabetsu, Aomori
Yomogita, Aomori